Daviesia asperula is a species of flowering plant in the family Fabaceae and is endemic to South Australia. It is a compact or spreading shrub with often crowded, flattened, tapering or curved, sharply pointed phyllodes, and orange-yellow and red flowers.

Description

Taxonomy and naming
Daviesia asperula was first formally described in 1995 by Michael Crisp in Australian Systematic Botany from specimens collected by Betty Phillips near Rocky River on Kangaroo Island in 1965. The specific epithet (asperula) means "slightly rough", referring to the branchlets and phyllodes.

In the same journal, Crisp described two subspecies and the names are accepted by the Australian Plant Census:
 Daviesia asperula Crisp subsp. asperula has phyllodes that are broadest at or near the base;
 Daviesia asperula Crisp subsp. obliqua Crisp has curved phyllodes that are broadest at or beyond the middle.

Distribution and habitat
This species of pea mainly grows in mallee or open forest in poor soils on the Eyre and Fleurieu Peninsulas and on Kangaroo Island in South Australia.

References

asperula
Flora of South Australia
Plants described in 1995
Taxa named by Michael Crisp